This page is a glossary of notaphily. Notaphily is the study of paper money or banknotes.


Terms

Further reading

A Guide Book of United States Coins by R.S. Yeoman

References
Coin World Glossary
Dictionary.com
2005 Blackbook Price Guide to United States Paper Money 
  "Numismatic Terms and Methods" from the American Numismatic Society

Notaphily
Numismatics
Wikipedia glossaries using description lists